C-bomb could mean:

Cobalt bomb - a type of doomsday device.
Cunt - an English-language profanity which is widely considered to be particularly strong.
C-bomb (PlayStation Network) - a problem with the PlayStation Network online gaming service